François Alexandre Aubert de La Chenaye-Desbois (17 June 1699 – 29 February 1783) was a French writer, genealogist and compiler.

Life
Chenaye-Desbois was born in Ernée and died in Paris.

Works
He is mainly known for his genealogical dictionaries of the French nobility. The first edition with the title Dictionnaire généalogique, héraldique, chronologique et historique was published by Duchesne in seven volumes (1757–1765). The second edition with the title Dictionnaire de la noblesse... ("Dictionary of Nobility...") was published by Duchesne in 15 volumes (1770–1786). The final three volumes were edited and continued by Jacques Badier. In the 19th century, a third edition was published by Schlesinger in 19 volumes (1863–1876). The third edition was reprinted in facsimile by Kraus in 1969. 

In English, this translates roughly to Dictionary of the nobles; containing the genealogies, history, and timeline of noble families of France; the explanation of their coats of arms, and the state of the domains; those having the titles of Prince, Duke, Marquis, Count, Viscount, Baron, etc., by creation, heritage, alliance, donation, substitution, transfer, sale, or other.

Notes

Bibliography
 Estrée, Paul (1897). "Un autre abbé Prévost", pp. 395-404, 465-471, 512-524, in Bulletin du bibliophile et du bibliothécaire.

External links
 Dictionnaire généalogique, héraldique, chronologique et historique, first edition (1757–1765), 7 volumes
 Catalog record (vol. 1, Universidad Complutense de Madrid) at HathiTrust
 Catalog record (vol. 2, Universidad Complutense de Madrid at HathiTrust
 Catalog record (vol. 3, Universidad Complutense de Madrid) at HathiTrust
 Catalog record (vol. 5, New York Public Library) at HathiTrust
 Dictionnaire de la noblesse, second edition (1770–1786), 15 volumes:
 Catalog record (15 volumes) at HathiTrust
 Catalog record (vols. 4, 6, 9, 11, 12; New York Public Library) at Hathitrust
 Dictionnaire de la noblesse, third edition (1863-1877), 19 volumes
 Catalog record (19 volumes) at HathiTrust
 Vols. 1–9 at Gallica

18th-century French writers
French genealogists
1699 births
1784 deaths